Turid Sannes is a Norwegian handball player. She played 54 matches and scored 122 goals for the Norway women's national handball team between 1975 and 1977.  She participated at the 1975 World Women's Handball Championship, where the Norwegian team placed 8th.

References

Year of birth missing (living people)
Possibly living people
Norwegian female handball players